Advance commonly refers to:
Advance, an offensive push in sports, games, thoughts, military combat, or sexual or romantic pursuits
Advance payment for goods or services
Advance against royalties, a payment to be offset against future royalty payments

Advance may also refer to:

United States 
Advance, California
Advance, Indiana
Flatwoods, Kentucky, originally known as Advance
Advance, Michigan
Advance, Missouri
Advance, North Carolina
Advance, Ohio
Advance, Wisconsin
Advance Township, North Dakota

Canada 
Advance, Ontario

Ships 
Advance (or A. D. Vance), a Confederate blockade runner (1863-1864)
Advance (1872), a wooden Top sail schooner
Advance (1874), a Composite Schooner
Advance (1884), an Iron Steamer screw Tug
Advance (1903), a diesel powered wooden carvel schooner
Advance (shipwrecked 1933), a screw steamer
, several ships of the US Navy

Organizations 
Advance Together, a short-lived British political party
Advance (trade union), a trade union based in the United Kingdom
Advance Publications, an American media company
Advance Digital, part of Advance Local, owned by Advance Publications
Advance Newspapers, based in Hudsonville, Michigan
Barrie Advance, a weekly newspaper serving Barrie, Ontario
Advance (newspaper), a Sudanese newspaper
Advance Thun, a Swiss paraglider manufacturer

Music 
Advance (album), a 1996 album by British techno act LFO
Advance!, a jazz album by drummer Philly Joe Jones
Advance/Mata Asa ga Kuru, song by Tokio

Other uses 
Advance (English automobile), an English tricar
Advance (Australian motorcycle), a built-to-order bike 1905–1906
Advance Thun, a Swiss paraglider manufacturer
Advance (horse), a Thoroughbred horse
Game Boy Advance, a 2001 Nintendo handheld
Game Boy Advance SP, the 2003 successor
Nilfisk-Advance, a brand of cleaning equipment

See also
 
 
 Advancement (disambiguation)

 Ahead (disambiguation)
 Forward (disambiguation)
 Retreat (disambiguation)